An entocentric lens is a compound lens which has its entrance or exit pupil inside the lens. This is the most common type of photographic lens.

See also
 Telecentric lens
Hypercentric lens

References

Photographic lenses